Dr. John Arnold Farm is a historic home and farm and national historic district located in Union Township, Rush County, Indiana.  The farmhouse was built in 1853, and is two-story, Gothic Revival style frame dwelling. It is sheathed in clapboard and has a five-gabled roof forming a double crossed "T"-plan.  It features a wraparound front porch added about 1900, and a decorative vergeboard. Also on the property are the contributing remains of an early settlement established in the 1820s, including the remains of the original John Arnold cabin, tomb, and cemetery.  Other contributing buildings and structures include a smokehouse, milk house, privy, tool shed, buggy shed / garage, chicken house, granary, corn crib / shed, cattle barn, calf shed, and two additional corn cribs.

It was listed on the National Register of Historic Places in 1989.

See also
 William W. Arnold (ornithologist), son of Dr. John and Sarah Arnold

References

Historic districts on the National Register of Historic Places in Indiana
Farms on the National Register of Historic Places in Indiana
Houses completed in 1853
Gothic Revival architecture in Indiana
Historic districts in Rush County, Indiana
National Register of Historic Places in Rush County, Indiana